Live in Frisco is the second live album by the Mentors. It is an extract of three tracks recorded at a concert in San Francisco in 1983. Live in Frisco was also released as in a double pack with the Get Up and Die EP.

The tracks were later placed as bonus tracks on a reissue of El Duce's The Karaoke King album on CD. In 2004, "Having Sickie's Baby" was released as a bonus track on the CD re-release of Live at the Whiskey.

Track listing

Personnel
 El Duce — drums, lead vocals
 Sickie Wifebeater — guitar
 Ed Danky  — bass

1987 live albums
Mentors (band) albums